Lesley Felomina (born December 7, 1972), known as Lesley, is an Curaçaon/Aruban footballer who plays as a Striker/Midfielder for Aruban Division Uno club Estudiantes and a former member of the Aruba national football team. He has played for the Aruba national team during the 2002 FIFA World Cup qualifying rounds.

Honours
Britannia
Torneo Copa Betico Croes: 2008-09, 2009-10, 2010-11, 2011-12,

References

External links

1972 births
Living people
Aruban footballers
Association football midfielders
SV Estrella players
SV La Fama players
SV Britannia players
Aruba international footballers